Taleh Shahsuvarly is an Azerbaijani author, journalist and political analyst.

Biography 

Taleh Shahsuvarly was born in Barda region of Karabakh) in 1977. He graduated from the philosophy faculty of Baku State University.

His literature work "Re-incernation" ("Canlanma") is the first historiographical metafiction published in Azerbaijan.

References 

Living people
1977 births
Azerbaijani writers
Azerbaijani journalists